The Council of Saint-Félix, a landmark in the organisation of the Cathars, was held at Saint-Felix-de-Caraman, now called Saint-Félix-Lauragais, in 1167. The senior figure, who apparently presided and gave the consolamentum to the assembled Cathar bishops (some newly appointed), was papa Nicetas, Bogomil bishop of Constantinople.

The acts of the council are known from a printed text published by Guillaume Besse in the 17th century, a copy he made of a now lost 1223 copy that he possessed. The genuineness of this document has been doubted. The copy seen by Besse had been made in 1223 by Pierre Poulhan, who was (at that date or soon after) Cathar bishop of Carcassonne.

According to Besse's text, the following Cathar bishops were recognised by the council and consoled by Nicetas:

 Robert d'Espernon, bishop of the French, i.e. of northern France
 Sicard le Cellerier, bishop of Albi
 Mark, bishop of Lombardy, apparently synonymous with Italy
 Bernard Raimond, bishop of Toulouse
 Gerald Mercier, bishop of Carcassonne
 Raymond de Casals, bishop of Agen

Nicetas instructed the assembly that, just as the Seven Churches of Asia did not interfere with one another's independence, neither did the modern bishoprics of the Bogomils, and nor must the bishoprics of the Cathars. Boundsmen were appointed to determine the boundary between the bishoprics of Toulouse and Carcassonne: the latter was given a large territory extending from Narbonne to Lerida.

Bibliography

 Guillaume Besse, Histoire des ducs, marquis et comtes de Narbonne (Paris, 1660) pp. 483–6: Latin text.
 Jean Duvernoy, Le catharisme: l'histoire des cathares (Toulouse: Privat, 1979) pp. 215–219: French translation.
 B. Hamilton, J. Hamilton, Christian dualist heresies in the Byzantine world c. 650-c. 1450 (Manchester: Manchester University Press, 1998) pp. 250–252: English translation.
 Judith Mann, The Trail of Gnosis (Gnosis Traditions Press 2002) p108

Catharism
12th-century church councils
1167 in Europe
1160s in France